Paris Street; Rainy Day is a large 1877 oil painting by the French artist Gustave Caillebotte (1848–1894), and is his best known work. It shows a number of individuals walking through the Place de Dublin, then known as the Carrefour de Moscou, at an intersection to the east of the Gare Saint-Lazare in north Paris. Although Caillebotte was a friend and patron of many of the impressionist painters, and this work is part of that school, it differs in its realism and reliance on line rather than broad brush strokes.

Caillebotte's interest in photography is evident. The figures in the foreground appear "out of focus", those in the mid-distance (the carriage and the pedestrians in the intersection) have sharp edges, while the features in the background become progressively indistinct. The severe cropping of some figures – particularly the man to the far right – further suggests the influence of photography.

The painting was first shown at the Third Impressionist Exhibition of 1877. It is currently owned by the Art Institute of Chicago. AIC curator Gloria Groom described the work as "the great picture of urban life in the late 19th century."

Description

The tone of the light indicates that the painting is set on a wintery afternoon, and the two main figures walk underneath an umbrella. They are dressed in the height of contemporary Parisian fashion. She wears a hat, veil, diamond earring, demure brown dress, and a fur lined coat, described in 1877 as "modern – or should I say, the latest fashion". The man wears a moustache, topcoat, frock coat, top hat, bow tie, starched white shirt, buttoned waistcoat and an open long coat with collar turned up. They are unambiguously middle class. Some working class figures may be seen in the background; a maid in a doorway, the decorator carrying a ladder, cut-off by the umbrella above him. Caillebotte juxtaposes the figures and the perspective in a playful manner, with one man appearing to jump from the wheel of a carriage; another pair of legs appear below the rim of an umbrella.

The painting does not present a convivial mood. The figures seem mostly isolated, and their expressions are largely downcast. They appear to hurry rather than stroll through the streets, absorbed in their own thoughts. The umbrellas shield them, in the words of Rose-Marie Hagen, "not just from the rain, but, also it seems, from other passers by". Characteristic of the positioning of the figures, the heads and eyes of the main couple are faced away from the man approaching them from their right. Hagen believes that given their close quarters, they will both be unable to comfortably step out of the man's way, but also their averted gaze applies equally to the viewer, who looks from a perspective equal to us. Caillebotte reproduces the effect of a camera lens in that the points at the center of the image seem to bulge. He also recreates the focusing effect of the camera in the way that it sharpens certain subjects of an image, but not others. The same purpose is seen in the overall clarity of the image. The foreground is in focus, but slightly smudged; the middle ground has sharp, clear edges and well defined subjects, and the background fades into the distance, becoming more and more blurry the farther back the eye travels. He makes the middle ground section more clear, mimicking the effect of a camera.

The figures appear to have walked into the painting, as though Caillebotte was taking a snapshot of people going about their day; in fact, he spent months carefully placing them within the pictorial space. The painting is highly linear; its focus draws the viewer's eye to the vantage point at the center of the buildings in the background. The strong vertical of the central green lamp post divides the painting; a horizontal alignment breaks the painting into quarters; the gaslight at the center of the picture throws shadows on the wet cobblestones, and divides the composition in two. Cobblestones dominate one full quarter of the canvas.

Setting

The neoclassical buildings reflect the construction works of Baron Haussmann. The view shown is spacious, and details a broad view of a number of streets. Although the ashlar facades of the buildings might today seem uniform, at the time they would have been modern and fresh – in Caillebotte's youth the area was a hill just beyond the city edge just beginning to be developed as a residential center for the bourgeoisie. 
 
The point of view of the roads and the buildings portrayed allows Caillebotte to use two-point perspective.

The ground floor of the building between the Rue de Moscou and the Rue Clapeyron, showing a 'pharmacie' sign in the painting, still houses a pharmacy today.

Reception and provenance

Émile Zola, often a critic of Caillebotte,  praised this work in an article "Notes parisiennes: Une exposition: les peintres impressionnistes" published in Le Sémaphore de Marseille in 1877.

As with many of Caillebotte's paintings, it remained with the family until the mid twentieth century. It was acquired by Walter P. Chrysler Jr. in 1955, who in turn sold it to the Art Institute of Chicago in 1964.

The painting was featured in the 1980 BBC television series 100 Great Paintings, and Paris Street; Rainy Day plays a prominent role in the 1986 film Ferris Bueller's Day Off.

The painting is featured in the photograph Art Institute of Chicago II, Chicago (1990), by German photographer Thomas Struth, which depicts the room where it was exhibited at the time, with some onlookers.

Gallery

References

Sources

 Broude, Norma. Gustave Caillebotte and the Fashioning of Identity in Impressionist Paris. Rutgers University Press, 2002. 
 Hagen, Rose-Marie. Masterpieces in Detail. London: Taschen, 2010. 
 Weinberg, Helene Barbara. American Impressionism and Realism: The Painting of Modern Life, 1885–1915. New York: Metropolitan Museum Of Art, 1994.

External links

Paris Street; Rainy Day, 1877, one of the Art Institute of Chicago's digital scholarly catalogues 
 Caillebotte Paris Street; Rainy Day Returns, Art Institute of Chicago
 Gustave Caillebotte's Paris Street; Rainy Day, (4:44) Smarthistory
 Video Postcard: Paris Street; Rainy Day (1877), (1:47) Art Institute of Chicago

1877 paintings
Paintings in the collection of the Art Institute of Chicago
Paintings by Gustave Caillebotte
Rain in art